The Fencing competition in the 2007 Summer Universiade were held in Bangkok, Thailand.

Medal overview

Men's events

Women's events

Medal table

References
 Bangkok 2007 - Fencing results from fisu.net

2007 Summer Universiade
Universiade
Fencing at the Summer Universiade
International fencing competitions hosted by Thailand